Andreas Schwab (born 9 April 1973) is a German politician and member of the European Parliament for Germany. He is a member of the Christian Democratic Union, part of the European People's Party. Since 2009, he has been Of Counsel with CMS Hasche Sigle.

Member of the European Parliament, 2004–present
Schwab serves on the Committee on the Internal Market and Consumer Protection (IMCO), where he deals with network and information security. He is the European People's Party Group’s coordinator on the committee.

From 2010 to 2011, Schwab drafted the European Parliament's report on the EU Consumer Rights Directive. As shadow rapporteur, he has issued opinions on the negotiations for the Transatlantic Trade and Investment Partnership (2015) and on the Annual Report on EU Competition Policy (2015). In 2014, he co-sponsored (with Ramon Tremosa) a non-binding bill before the European Parliament calling on the European Commission to consider separating Google’s search-engine business from its other commercial activities to ensure fair competition on the internet. He also led the European Parliament's negotiating team on internet platform regulation in Europe. He later served as rapporteur on the ECN+ Directive that entered in law early 2019, handing national competition authorities more enforcement powers to ensure the functioning of the EU's single market. In 2021, he became the parliament's rapporteur on the Digital Markets Act.

In addition, Schwab serves as a member of the European Parliament's Sky and Space Intergroup (SSI) and the European Parliament Intergroup on Biodiversity, Countryside, Hunting and Recreational Fisheries.

Other activities
 University of Freiburg, Member of the Advisory Board
 Franco-German Institute (DFI), Member of the Board
 Nachsorgeklinik Tannheim, Member of the Board of Trustees
 European Council on Foreign Relations (ECFR), Member
 Kangaroo Group, Member
 Transatlantic Policy Network (TPN), Member
 European Internet Foundation, Member
 European Logistics Platform, Member of the Advisory Board

Awards
In 1998, Schwab was elected for the "Young European of the Year" due to his commitment to Franco-German relations and received a scholarship from the Heinz Schwarzkopf Foundation.

In addition, in 2018 he received the Federal Cross of Merit of the Federal Republic of Germany.

References

1973 births
Living people
Christian Democratic Union of Germany MEPs
MEPs for Germany 2019–2024
MEPs for Germany 2014–2019
MEPs for Germany 2009–2014
MEPs for Germany 2004–2009
Recipients of the Cross of the Order of Merit of the Federal Republic of Germany
People from Rottweil